Allegheny Cemetery is one of the largest and oldest burial grounds in Pittsburgh, Pennsylvania. It is a historic rural cemetery.

The non-sectarian, wooded hillside park is located at 4734 Butler Street in the Lawrenceville neighborhood, and bounded by the Bloomfield, Garfield, and Stanton Heights areas. It is sited on the north-facing slope of hills above the Allegheny River.

In 1973 the cemetery's Butler Street Gatehouse was listed on the National Register of Historic Places and, in 1980, the entire cemetery was listed on the National Register.

History
Incorporated in 1844, the Allegheny Cemetery is the sixth oldest rural cemetery in the United States. It has been expanded over the years and now encompasses .

Allegheny Cemetery memorializes more than 124,000 people. Some of the oldest graves are of soldiers who fought in the French and Indian War. Their remains were reinterred here, moved from their original burial site at Trinity Cathedral in downtown Pittsburgh. Many notables from the city of Pittsburgh are buried here. The cemetery was among those profiled in the PBS documentary A Cemetery Special.

In 1834, three members of the Third Presbyterian Church of Pittsburgh, Dr. J. Ramsey Speer, Stephen Colwell and John Chislett Sr. determined to establish a rural cemetery near Pittsburgh. Dr. Speer later visited several famous rural cemeteries, Mount Auburn Cemetery in Boston, Laurel Hill Cemetery in Philadelphia, and Green-Wood Cemetery in Brooklyn, New York. In 1842 the group selected the 100-acre farm of Colonel Bayard for the site. An Act of Incorporation passed the Pennsylvania Legislature and was signed by Gov. David R. Porter on April 24, 1844.

Mt. Barney was selected as the site of a memorial to naval heroes in 1848, and Commodore Joshua Barney and Lt. James L. Parker were reinterred there. On Memorial Day, 1937, a new memorial was unveiled at Allegheny Cemetery, dedicated to the more than 7,000 servicemen buried here.

Notable interments

Gabriel Adams (1790–1864), Mayor of Pittsburgh (1847–1849)
John Arbuckle (1838–1912), coffee and sugar businessman
Marcus E. Baldwin (1863–1929), Major League Baseball player
Joseph Barker (1806–1862), Mayor of Pittsburgh (1850–1851)
Joshua Barney (1759–1818), Commodore in the United States Navy and American Revolutionary War, War of 1812 veteran (Moved to new site in 1848)
Richard Biddle (1796–1847), US Congressman
Lem Billings (1916–1981), friend and campaigner for President John F. Kennedy
William Bingham (18081873), Mayor of Pittsburgh (1856–1857)
James Blackmore (1821-1875), Mayor of Pittsburgh (1868–1869) and (1872–1875)
Francis B. Brewer (1820–1892), US Congressman
Don Brockett (1930–1995), motion picture and television actor, "Chef Brockett" on the PBS series Mister Rogers' Neighborhood
Adam M. Brown (1826–1910), Mayor of Pittsburgh (1901)
James W. Brown (1844–1909), US Congressman
Jared M. Brush (1814–1895), Mayor of Pittsburgh (1869–1872)
Eben Byers (1880–1932), wealthy American industrialist and socialite noted for his gruesome death caused by consumption of the radioactive patent medicine Radithor.
John Caldwell Jr. (1827–1902), George Westinghouse partner and member of the South Fork Fishing and Hunting Club
Louis Semple Clarke (1867–1957), automotive pioneer, founder of the Autocar Company and member of the South Fork Fishing and Hunting Club
James Wallace Conant (1862–1906), manager of the Schenley Park Casino and Duquesne Gardens, and founder of the Western Pennsylvania Hockey League.
Beano Cook (1931–2012), college football commentator
Daniel William Cooper (1830-1920), one of the founders of the Sigma Chi Fraternity
John Dalzell (1845–1927), US Congressman
Cornelius Darragh (1809–1854), US Congressman
Ebenezer Denny (1761–1822), first Mayor of Pittsburgh (1816–1817), American Revolutionary War veteran
Harmar Denny (1794–1852), U.S. Congressman
Harmar D. Denny Jr. (1886–1966), US Congressman
William J. Diehl (1845–1929), politician and Mayor of Pittsburgh (1899–1901)
Samuel Diescher (1839-1915), engineer who designed the Duquesne Incline and the majority of such projects in Pennsylvania and the US, also designed many industrial projects
Harry Allison Estep (1884–1968), US Congressman
John Baptiste Ford (1811–1903), industrialist, founder of PPG Industries and Ford City, Pennsylvania
Walter Forward (1786–1852), United States Secretary of the Treasury
Stephen Foster (1826–1864), songwriter
Andrew Fulton (1850–1925), Mayor of Pittsburgh (1884–1887)
Edward D. Gazzam (1803-1878), doctor, politician, and abolitionist
Josh Gibson (1911–1947), baseball great of the Negro leagues
Gus Greenlee (1893–1952), Major League Baseball Team Owner
George W. Guthrie (1848–1917), Mayor of Pittsburgh (1906–1909)
John B. Guthrie (1807–1885), Mayor of Pittsburgh (1851–1853)
Lizzie M. Guthrie (1838-1880), missionary
Moses Hampton (1803–1878), US Congressman
Alexander Hay (1806–1882), Mayor of Pittsburgh (1842–1845)
General Alexander Hays (1819–1864)
William B. Hays (1844–1912), Mayor of Pittsburgh (1903–1906)
Joseph Horne (1826–1891), founder of Pittsburgh department store Horne's; this chain closed in 1994
Thomas Marshall Howe (1808–1877), US Congressman
Alfred E. Hunt (1855–1899), co-founder of the company that became Alcoa
Thomas Irwin (1785–1870), US Congressman
William Wallace Irwin (1803–1856), US Congressman, Mayor of Pittsburgh (1840–1841)
William Freame Johnston (1808–1872), Governor of Pennsylvania
William Kerr (1809–1853), Mayor of Pittsburgh (1846–1847)
Samuel Kier (1813–1874), pioneer oil refiner
Charles H. Kline (1870–1933), Mayor of Pittsburgh (1926–1933)
Andrew W. Loomis (1797–1873), US Congressman
F. T. F. Lovejoy (1854–1932), Industrialist, associate of Andrew Carnegie
James Lowry Jr. (1820–1876), Mayor of Pittsburgh (1864–1866)
William McClelland (1842–1892), US Congressman
Charles McClure (1804–1846), US Congressman
James McCord (1822–1894), millionaire owner of the oldest hattery west of the Allegheny Mountains and member of the South Fork Fishing and Hunting Club
Henry Sellers McKee (1843–1924), millionaire glass manufacturer, founder of Jeannette, Pennsylvania and member of the South Fork Fishing and Hunting Club
Robert McKnight (1820–1885), US Congressman
William McNair (1880–1948), Mayor of Pittsburgh (1934–1936)
Thomas Mellon (1813–1908), founder of Mellon Bank
Alexander Pollock Moore (1867–1930), publisher of the Pittsburgh Leader and ambassador who was married to actress Lillian Russell
James Kennedy Moorhead (1806–1884), US Congressman
Philip H. Morgan (1825–1900), lawyer, jurist, diplomat
General James S. Negley (1826–1901), Civil War general and U.S. Congressman
John Neville (1731–1803), American Revolutionary War veteran and tax collector during the Whiskey Rebellion
George Tener Oliver (1848–1919), publisher of the Pittsburgh Gazette Times and Chronicle Telegraph, US Senator
Alfred L. Pearson (1838–1903), United States Army officer
Henry Kirke Porter (1840–1921), US Congressman
James Hay Reed (1853–1927), founding partner, Knox & Reed (now Reed Smith LLP), and member of the South Fork Fishing and Hunting Club
Robert M. Riddle (1812–1858), Mayor of Pittsburgh (1853–1854)
John Buchanan Robinson (1846–1933), US Congressman
William Robinson Jr. (1785–1868), politician, businessman and militia general
Calbraith Perry Rodgers (1879–1912), aviation pioneer
James Ross (1762–1847), US Senator
Archibald H. Rowand Jr. (1845–1913), Civil War Congressional Medal of Honor Recipient
Lillian Russell (1861–1922), singer, actress
Ted Sadowski (1936–1993), Major League Baseball Player
Richard Mellon Scaife (1932–2014), billionaire supporter of conservative causes, publisher of the Pittsburgh Tribune-Review
George Shiras Jr. (1832–1924), United States Supreme Court Associate Justice
Jacob B. Sweitzer (1821-1888), Pennsylvania lawyer and soldier. He commanded the 2nd Brigade of the 1st Division/5th Corps of the Army of the Potomac at the Battle of Gettysburg
Jane Swisshelm (1815–1884), journalist, abolitionist, and women's rights advocate
Adamson Tannehill (1750–1820), US Congressman
Benjamin Thaw (1859–1933), Pittsburgh financier and member of the South Fork Fishing and Hunting Club
Harry Kendall Thaw (1871–1947), murderer of architect Stanford White, husband of Evelyn Nesbit
James Thomson (1790–1876), Mayor of Pittsburgh (1841–1842)
Stanley Turrentine (1934–2000), jazz musician
Ferdinand E. Volz (1823–1876), Mayor of Pittsburgh (1854–1856)
Rachel Mellon Walton (1899-2006), member of the prominent Mellon family, centenarian, and prominent Pittsburgh philanthropist
Henry A. Weaver (1820–1890), Mayor of Pittsburgh (1857–1860)
Calvin Wells (1827–1909), industrialist, financier and member of the South Fork Fishing and Hunting Club
Jane McDowell Foster Wiley (1829–1903), wife of Stephen Foster and inspiration for his song "Jeanie with the Light Brown Hair"
Thomas Williams (1806–1872), Civil War congressman, prosecutor in the impeachment of President Andrew Johnson.
The unidentified remains of 54 victims of the 1862 Allegheny Arsenal explosion.

Gallery

See also 
 Homewood Cemetery
 Greenwood Cemetery

References

External links

Allegheny Cemetery at Find A Grave

Historic Landscape Survey of Allegheny County Records, 1970–2002, AIS.2005.01, Archives Service Center, University of Pittsburgh

Cemeteries established in the 1840s
Cemeteries in Pittsburgh
Cemeteries on the National Register of Historic Places in Pennsylvania
Historic American Landscapes Survey in Pennsylvania
History of Pittsburgh
Pittsburgh History & Landmarks Foundation Historic Landmarks
1844 establishments in Pennsylvania
National Register of Historic Places in Pittsburgh
Lawrenceville (Pittsburgh)
Rural cemeteries